Jacques du Broeucq (c.1505 – c.1584) was a sculptor and architect from Southern Netherlands, who is believed to have spent c. 1530-35 in Italy.

Jacques du Broeucq was born and died in Mons and is perhaps best known as the teacher of Giambologna in Antwerp.

Du Broeucq rebuilt Binche Palace south of Brussels for Queen Mary of Hungary, governess of the Spanish Netherlands, in 1545–49; Binche, the center of Mary's patronage, was intended to rival Fontainebleau; it was demolished by the soldiers of Henry II of France in 1554.

He also designed the castle of Boussu and Mariemont Palace.

One of his most famous apprentice was Jean Boulogne, better known as Giovanni Bologne or Giambologna.

Artworks 
 Mausoleum of the Counts of Boussu, Church of Boussu.

References

Walloon sculptors
Walloon architects

Flemish sculptors (before 1830)
Architects of the Habsburg Netherlands
1584 deaths
Year of birth unknown
Year of birth uncertain